Gilbert or Émile Bougnol (31 August 1866 in Saint-Myon, France – 20 October 1947 in Rueil-Malmaison, France) was a French professional fencer who competed in the late 19th century and early 20th century. He participated in Fencing at the 1900 Summer Olympics in Paris and won the silver medal in the masters épée.

References

External links

French male épée fencers
Olympic silver medalists for France
Olympic fencers of France
Fencers at the 1900 Summer Olympics
1866 births
1947 deaths
People from Rueil-Malmaison
Olympic medalists in fencing
Medalists at the 1900 Summer Olympics